The 1974 NHL Amateur Draft was the 12th NHL Entry Draft. It was held via conference call at the NHL office in Montreal, Quebec. In an effort to prevent the WHA from poaching players, the draft was conducted early and in secret. This failed to prevent tampering as information leaked out via agents and other sources over the three days of the draft. As a statement of frustration at the slow, secretive conference call format, Buffalo General Manager Punch Imlach claimed "Taro Tsujimoto" of the "Tokyo Katanas" of Japan using the 183rd overall pick. NHL officials immediately validated the selection, but weeks later Imlach admitted that Tsujimoto was a fabrication. The selection was ruled invalid by the NHL and removed from their records.

This also marked the first year the NHL allowed underage players to be signed, a move made in response to the WHA's similar practice the previous year.

The last active player in the NHL from this draft class was Mark Howe, who retired after the 1994–95 season.

Selections by round 
Below are listed the selections in the 1974 NHL amateur draft.

Round one 

 The Vancouver Canucks' first-round pick went to the Montreal Canadiens as the result of a trade on May 15, 1973 that sent Montreal's first-round pick (Bob Dailey) in 1973 NHL Amateur Draft to Vancouver in exchange for this pick.
 The St. Louis Blues' first-round pick went to the Montreal Canadiens as the result of a trade on March 9, 1974 that sent  Dave Gardner to St. Louis in exchange for this pick.
 The Atlanta Flames' first-round pick went to the Montreal Canadiens as the result of a trade on May 29, 1973 that sent Chuck Arnason to Atlanta in exchange for this pick.
 The Los Angeles Kings' first-round pick went to the Montreal Canadiens as the result of a trade on May 29, 1973 that sent Bob Murdoch and Randy Rota to Los Angeles in exchange for cash and this pick.
 The Philadelphia Flyers' first-round pick went to the California Golden Seals as the result of a trade on May 24, 1974 that sent Reggie Leach to Philadelphia in exchange for Al MacAdam, Larry Wright and this pick.

Round two 

 The St. Louis Blues' second-round pick went to the Boston Bruins as the result of a trade on October 5, 1973 that sent Don Awrey to St. Louis in exchange for Jake Rathwell, cash and this pick.
 The Pittsburgh Penguins' second-round pick went to the St. Louis Blues as the result of a trade on January 17, 1974 that sent Ab DeMarco Jr., Steve Durbano and Bob Kelly to St. Louis in exchange for Greg Polis, Bryan Watson and this pick.
 The Los Angeles Kings' second-round pick went to the Montreal Canadiens as the result of a trade on August 22, 1972 that sent Terry Harper to Los Angeles in exchange for Los Angeles' third-round pick in the 1975 NHL Amateur Draft, a first-round pick in the 1976 NHL Amateur Draft and this pick.

Round three 

 The Pittsburgh Penguins' third-round pick went to the Detroit Red Wings as the result of a trade on May 27, 1974 that sent Nelson Debenedet to Pittsburgh in exchange for Hank Nowak and this pick.

Round four 

 The St. Louis Blues' fourth-round pick went to the Montreal Canadiens as the result of a trade on May 27, 1974 that sent Rick Wilson and Montreal's fifth-round pick in 1974 NHL Amateur Draft to St. Louis in exchange for future considerations (Glen Sather) and this pick.

Round five 

 The Montreal Canadiens' fifth-round pick went to the St. Louis Blues as the result of a trade on May 27, 1974 that sent St. Louis' fourth-round picks in 1974 NHL Amateur Draft and future considerations (Glen Sather) to Montreal in exchange for Rick Wilson and this pick.

Round six

Round seven

Round eight

Round nine

Round ten

Round eleven

Round twelve

Round thirteen

Round fourteen

Round fifteen

Round sixteen

Round seventeen

Round eighteen

Round nineteen

Round twenty

Round twenty one

Round twenty two

Round twenty three

Round twenty four

Round twenty five

Draftees based on nationality 

The Asia / Japan selection was later invalidated, once Buffalo Sabres General Manager Punch Imlach admitted that "Taro Tsujimoto" of Japan, a low selection (eleventh round, 183rd overall), was a fabrication in answer to his frustration over the format of the 1974 draft.

See also 
 1974–75 NHL season
 1974 NHL Expansion Draft
 1974 WHA Amateur Draft
 List of NHL players

Notes

References 
 2005 NHL Official Guide & Record Book

External links 
 HockeyDraftCentral.com
 1974 NHL Amateur Draft player stats at The Internet Hockey Database

Draft
National Hockey League Entry Draft